Hammarland is a municipality of Åland, an autonomous territory of Finland.

The municipality has a population of 
which 
is water. The population density is
.

The municipality is unilingually Swedish.  of its population has Swedish as their native language, making Hammarland one of the municipalities with the highest percentage of Swedish-speakers in Finland.

Märket, the westernmost point of Finland, is an exclave of Hammarland.

The most significant main road of Hammarland is the Highway 1 between Mariehamn and Eckerö.

References

External links 

 Municipal of Hammarland – Official website The official website of Hammarland]

Municipalities of Åland